Lugnaquilla, at , is the 11th–highest peak in Ireland on the Arderin list, and 13th–highest on the Vandeleur-Lynam list, and the highest Irish mountain outside of Kerry.  Lugnaquilla is the highest point in Wicklow, and in the province of Leinster.  Lugnaquilla is in the Wicklow Mountains, and overlooks the Glen of Imaal to the west and Glenmalure to the east.

Naming
Irish academic Paul Tempan wrote in his 2010 Irish Hill and Mountain Names, that the summit plateau is marked as Percy's Table, named after an 18th–century local landowner, Colonel Percy. This is similar to Dawson's Table on the summit of Galtymore. Tempan also notes that P.W. Joyce gave the original form as Log na Coilleach, which translates as "hollow of the (grouse) cocks", however, Tempan says that "this seems doubtful".  

Tempan clarifies the name has no connection with the deity Lug, despite the common use of the term Lug as shorthand for Lugnaquilla, and that in some spellings of the name, several OS maps and guidebooks for example (e.g. Paddy Dillion's guidebooks), an "i" is added to give "Lugnaquillia"; however Tempan settles on "Lugnaquilla" as the proper name for the mountain.

Geology

The Geological Survey of Ireland ("GSI") describe Lugnaquilla as a "slate capped, granite rooted, relatively flat-topped mountain". Crags of dark-grey schist protrude from the upper cliff walls of Lugnaquilla's corries which are Ordovician in age.  The protrusions of lighter grey rock are granite.  The cap of schist overlying Lugnaquilla's granite core is the remnant roof of the magma chamber into which the Lugnaquilla granites were emplaced.  Cosmogenic dating on exposed bedrock showed that these schists were not covered by ice during the Last Glacial Maximum, and thus Lugnaquilla was a nunatak.

Geography 

Lugnaquilla is described as a "bulky mountain", with a large plateau-type grassy summit (known as Percy's Table), bounded on two sides by steep glacial corries called the "North Prison" (looking into the Glen of Imaal), and the "South Prison" (looking into the glen of the River Ow). On Lugnaquilla's eastern side is the cliff-lined hanging valley of Fraughan Rock Glen, which falls into the glacial U-shaped valley of Glenmalure.  Lugnaquilla is the source of the River Slaney.

Lugnaquilla does not have a rocky summit or summit ridges, and its large massif is described as a "sprawling mountain moorland".  Lug's massif includes several major summits and corrie lakes, often lying in a "horseshoe-shape" with Lug at the apex around deep valleys.  Around the Fraughan Rock Glen and Arts Lough in the east are Benleagh, and Clohernagh; around the glen of the Carrawaystick River and Kelly's Lough in the south-east are Corrigasleggaun, and again Clohernagh; around the glen of the River Ow in the south are Corrigasleggaun and Slievemaan; and finally, around the larger Glen of Imaal in the west are Ballineddan Mountain, Slievemaan, Camenabologue, Table Mountain, Lobawn, and Sugarloaf.   

Lugnaquilla is the highest mountain of the Wicklow Mountains range, and the highest mountain in Ireland outside County Kerry. Lugnaquila's large prominence qualifies it to meet the P600 classification (mountains known as the "Majors" in Britain and Ireland), and the Britain and Ireland Marilyn classification.  Lugnaquilla is the 4th-highest mountain in the MountainViews Online Database, 100 Highest Irish Mountains.

It is the 432nd–highest mountain, and 21st most prominent mountain, in Britain and Ireland, on the Simms classification.  Lugnaquilla is regarded by the Scottish Mountaineering Club ("SMC") as one of 34 Furths, which is a mountain above  in elevation, and meets the other SMC criteria for a Munro (e.g. "sufficient separation"), but which is outside of (or furth) Scotland; which is why Lugnaquilla is referred to as one of the 13 Irish Munros.

Hill walking 

The shortest route to the summit of Lugnaquilla is the 13-kilometre 4–5 hour Glen of Imaal Route (the "Tourist Route"), that starts at Fenton's Pub in the Glen of Imaal, and goes along the military access road via a grassy hill to Camarahill , and then up to the summit of Lugnaquilla.  The route crosses into the military artillery range, so walkers should check the range operating times in advance.

The 15–kilometre 5–6 hour Glenmalure Loop is described as "the most scenic circuit to Lugnaquilla".  It starts in the Baravore car park at the head of the Glenmalure valley and summits Lugnaquilla via the cliff–fringed hanging valley, Fraughan Rock Glen (the Glen is entered via the path at the Glenmalure Hostel); but returning via Cloghernagh , and down to the scenic Arts Lough , described as "one of the region's most beautiful sights", before descending back to the start of the Fraughan Rock Glen (or descending via Kelly's Lough and the glen of the Carrawaystick River).

The third, and least frequented route is the 16–kilometre 6-hour Aghavannagh Route, which starts at the Aghavannagh Bridge and walks the long forest tracks along the River Ow to the dramatic "South Prison" of Lugnaquilla, which is exited via the grassy–ramp of Green Street; return via same route.  The 12–kilometres of forest trails (getting to the south prison, and then on the return to the bridge) can be cycled instead.

Bibliography

See also

Wicklow Way
Wicklow Round
Lists of mountains in Ireland
List of Irish counties by highest point
List of mountains of the British Isles by height
List of P600 mountains in the British Isles
List of Furth mountains in the British Isles

References

External links
MountainViews: The Irish Mountain Website, Lugnaquilla
MountainViews: Irish Online Mountain Database
The Database of British and Irish Hills , the largest database of British Isles mountains ("DoBIH")
Hill Bagging UK & Ireland, the searchable interface for the DoBIH

Hewitts of Ireland
Marilyns of Ireland
Mountains and hills of County Wicklow
Highest points of Irish counties
Furths
Mountains under 1000 metres